Hammamlu-e Bala (also Romanized as Ḩammāmlū-e Bālā) is a village in Zanjanrud-e Pain Rural District, Zanjanrud District, Zanjan County, Zanjan Province, Iran. At the 2006 census, its population was 37, in 8 families.

References 

Populated places in Zanjan County